Mickey Amery ECA MLA (born April 26, 1982) is a Canadian politician and former lawyer who is serving as the Minister of Children Services since October 24, 2022. Amery was elected in the 2019 Alberta general election to represent the electoral district of Calgary-Cross in the 30th Alberta Legislature. He serves on the Social Services Cabinet Policy Committee and the Legislative Review Committee. 

Prior to his engagement in the Alberta Legislature, Amery was a practicing lawyer and business owner in Calgary, Alberta. He has worked on a number of cases of national significance in the areas of aboriginal law and consumer protection. Amery also served as a director for the Learning Disability Association of Alberta and as member on various local community boards and organizations. A University of Calgary Alumni, Amery holds a bachelor's degree in political science, a bachelor's degree in economics, and a Juris Doctorate degree in law.

Amery is the son of longtime Calgary-East MLA Moe Amery.

Electoral history

2019 general election

References

United Conservative Party MLAs
Living people
Politicians from Calgary
21st-century Canadian politicians
Canadian politicians of Lebanese descent
Members of the Executive Council of Alberta
1982 births